ZuPreem, a brand of Compana, manufactures and sells animal feeds, particularly for zoo animals and exotic pets. It is based in Kansas.

History 
The idea for ZuPreem started when Mark Morris, Sr. DVM, founder of Hill's Pet Nutrition, Inc., and his son Mark L. Morris Jr. DVM, PhD developed a range of specialized diets for cats and dogs with particular health concerns, marketed as Prescription Diets and Science Diets. A phone call to Mark Morris Jr. from a local zoo director Gary Clarke in 1964 lead him to begin researching the nutritional needs, and developing foods, for many different species of animals, including primates, bears, reptiles, birds, and exotic felines. David R. Morris, the son of Mark Morris Jr., ran the company from 1993-2021 expanding the line of foods with an emphasis on companion exotic animals. By 2007 the company determined that it had the largest market share of extruded/pelleted nutritional complete foods for companion birds in the United States and was sold in numerous countries around the world.

In April 2021 the company was sold to St. Louis-based Compana, which is managed by the investment firm The Carlyle Group.

External links

References

Animal food manufacturers
Food and drink companies established in 1964
Pet food brands
2021 mergers and acquisitions
Companies based in Kansas